Ambush in Leopard Street is a low budget 1962 British black and white crime film directed by J. Henry Piperno. It stars James Kenney, Michael Brennan, and Bruce Seton.

Premise
A small time crook, Harry, plans one last job before he retires, but things do not go quite according to plan. With his sidekick Nimmo, the plan is to ambush a truck containing £500,000 of diamonds in Leopard Street, but heavy security means recruiting a larger criminal gang than usual, and the inexperienced newcomers may derail Harry's scheme.                                                                                      
The car used by the gang at the beginning of the film is a 1959 Opel Olympia Caravan 2 door station wagon.

Cast  
 James Kenney as Johnny 
 Michael Brennan as Harry 
 Bruce Seton as Nimmo 
 Norman Rodway as Kegs 
 Jean Harvey as Jean 
 Pauline Delaney as Cath 
 Marie Conmee as Myra
 Charles Mitchell as Big George
 Lawrence Crain as Danny
 Muriel O'Hanlon as Lily
 Sheila Donald as Val
 Jack O'Reilly as Hibbs

References

External links
 

1962 films
1962 crime drama films
1960s heist films
British crime drama films
British heist films
1960s English-language films
1960s British films